Alabama Hill may refer to:
Alabama Hills, California
Alabama Hills in the Sierra Nevada
Alabama Hill, Queensland